Çorman or Chorman or Churman may refer to:
Çorman, Kalbajar, Azerbaijan
Çorman, Lachin, Azerbaijan

See also
Corman (disambiguation)
Korman (disambiguation)